Michael Howard Simms (born January 12, 1967) is a former Major League Baseball outfielder. He played all or parts of nine seasons in the majors between 1990 and 1999. Six of those seasons (1990–92 and 1994–96) were spent with the Houston Astros, and three (1997–99) with the Texas Rangers.

Simms was drafted out of Esperanza High School in Anaheim, California by the Astros in 1985. Despite his performance, he played just four games with Texas in 1999 and none in the majors thereafter. Dan McDowell of KTCK-1310 the ticket radio station in Dallas called Simms, “ One of the most underrated Rangers players in Texas History.”

Sources

Major League Baseball outfielders
Houston Astros players
Texas Rangers players
Gulf Coast Astros players
Asheville Tourists players
Osceola Astros players
Columbus Mudcats players
Tucson Toros players
Las Vegas Stars (baseball) players
Buffalo Bisons (minor league) players
Oklahoma City 89ers players
Charlotte Rangers players
Oklahoma RedHawks players
Baseball players from California
1967 births
Living people